Australian singer-songwriter Delta Goodrem has released seven studio albums, one extended play (EP), four video albums and thirty six singles and an additional four as a featured artist. Goodrem signed a record deal with Sony Music Entertainment in 1999 and, since then, has achieved five number one albums and nine number one songs in Australia.

Goodrem debuted in 2001 with a teen pop single titled "I Don't Care" that was not commercially successful. Her 2003 debut album Innocent Eyes revamped her musical style as piano-based ballad pop, and was a multi-platinum seller in Australia, New Zealand and the United Kingdom. Her successful singles were "Born to Try", "Lost Without You", "Innocent Eyes", "Not Me, Not I" and "Predictable". The album sold 1.2 million copies in Australia, and over 4 million worldwide.

Its successor, Mistaken Identity, was created during Goodrem's battle with Hodgkin's lymphoma, a form of cancer. While the album was unable to parallel the commercial success of Innocent Eyes, it did enter the ARIA charts at number one, and gained multi-platinum status. It featured successful top ten singles, "Mistaken Identity", "Out of the Blue" and "Almost Here". Goodrem's third album Delta, was released in October 2007. The album debuted at number one in Australia, making it her third consecutive chart-topping album there. It also achieved multi-platinum status in Australia. The singles included "In This Life" and "Believe Again", both of which achieved platinum status in Australia.

Her fourth album Child of the Universe was released in 2012. It spawned two hit singles, "Wish You Were Here" and "Sitting on Top of the World", which were both certified platinum in Australia, the latter eventually being certified triple platinum. Standalone single "Heart Hypnotic" went Gold. With the release of her fifth studio album, Wings of the Wild, which featured the multi platinum single "Wings" and the gold single "Dear Life", Goodrem earned her fourth number-one album. She later released "The River" and "Heavy" of that album.  Her Fifth #1 album came in 2021 with Bridge Over Troubled Dreams, featuring singles, "Keep Climbing", "Solid Gold", "Billionaire", "Paralyzed", and "All of My Friends" 

Goodrem's career global album sales exceed eight million. She has sold approximately 2 million singles, with 1,238,919 copies sold in Australia.

Albums

Studio albums

Soundtrack albums

Compilation albums

Extended plays

Singles

As lead artist

Featured singles

Promotional singles

Other charted songs

Videos

Video albums

Music videos

Other contributions

Writing credits

Notes

References

External links

Official website

Discography
Discographies of Australian artists
Pop music discographies